The 02274 / 02273 Jabalpur–Chanda Fort Intercity Superfast Special is a Superfast train of the Indian Railways connecting  in Madhya Pradesh and Chanda Fort of Maharashtra. It is currently being operated with 02274/02273 train numbers on a tri-weekly basis.

Route and halts 

The important halts of the train are:

Coach composition 

The train has refurbished ICF rake. The train consists of 10 coaches:
 1 AC Chair Car
 1 Sleeper coach
 8 General coaches

Traction 

As the route is electrified, a WAP-4 pulls the train to its destination.

Notes

References

External links
  at India Rail Info

Transport in Jabalpur
Express trains in India
Rail transport in Maharashtra
Rail transport in Madhya Pradesh
Railway services introduced in 2021